There are ten new songs revealed through the location tests of Dance Dance Revolution (2013). Two are only playable in Final Stage through special requirements. Two licensed songs have recently been revealed through advertising materials of the game. During the game's showcase in Japan Amusement Expo 2013 (JAEPO 2013), five more songs were revealed, three of which are licenses while the others are all Konami Originals.

The song list is split into two folders:  the 2013 and the 2014 versions. In DDR 2013, there are 102 new songs of 599 total. Most of the songs from previous versions returned, though there are a total of 19 songs that have been removed. In DDR 2014, there are 94 new songs of 671 total. Most of the songs from previous versions returned and some songs are moved to the newer version, though there are a total of 22 songs that have been removed.

Dance Dance Revolution A features 157 new songs of 809 total (129 new songs of 773 total in the North American release and 119 new songs of 761 total in the European release). 3 of them were available for play within a limited time period in Dance Dance Revolution (2014) as promotion. The promotional teaser for the game confirmed the following artists who composed the game's music: U1-ASAMi, Captain KING, DJ TOTTO, Musical Cosmology, Sota F., L.E.D.-G, Zodiac Fall, TAG, Nekomata Master, and CLUB SPICE. Most of the songs that made their Dance Dance Revolution arcade release debut on Dance Dance Revolution X3 VS 2ndMix, Dance Dance Revolution (2013), and Dance Dance Revolution (2014) have finally made their North American and European Dance Dance Revolution arcade release debut, including songs that have never been on a North American or European Dance Dance Revolution release have finally made their North American and European Dance Dance Revolution release debut, as those games were never released in those regions. Also, this marks the North American and European Dance Dance Revolution arcade release debut of I'm so Happy and Theory of Eternity from Dance Dance Revolution X2 as those songs weren't available on the North American and European arcade releases of the game due to the lack of e-Amusement in those regions. All Dancemania licenses have been removed due to their licenses expiring, making Dance Dance Revolution A the first core arcade Dance Dance Revolution title to have no traditional Dancemania licenses in it.

This is the first arcade appearance of Billboard Hot 100 songs since Dance Dance Revolution X2. This game also continues the previous licensing partnerships with EXIT TUNES, which includes Vocaloid music,  and Team Shanghai Alice, which includes music based on Touhou Project. There are 36 songs that are absent in the North American and European releases of the game due to licensing issues, which include 28 licenses from Dance Dance Revolution A, ミライプリズム from Dance Dance Revolution (2014), ずっとみつめていて (Ryu☆Remix) from Dance Dance Revolution (2013), and all licenses from Dance Dance Revolution X3 vs. 2ndMix. 3 licenses were also removed in the 2021 European update of the game, which include 放課後ストライド from Dance Dance Revolution A, 回レ！雪月花 from Dance Dance Revolution (2013), and only my railgun from Dance Dance Revolution X2. The Konami 50th Anniversary Memorial songs and 5 HinaBitter♪ songs are also absent in that regional release.

In Dance Dance Revolutin A20, there are currently 194 new songs of 982 total in 20th Anniversary cabinets in the Japanese release (179 new songs of 967 total in upgrade kits in the Asian and Hawaiian releases and 159 new songs of 946 total in the continental North American release). All songs that were unavailable in the North American release of Dance Dance Revolution A, with the only exception of The Light due to licensing issues, were finally made available in the North American release of Dance Dance Revolution A20. However, 20 new licenses are absent in that version of the game for the same reason. In Dance Dance Revolution A20 Plus, 22 licenses (20 from Dance Dance Revolution A, 回レ！雪月花 from Dance Dance Revolution (2013), and only my railgun from Dance Dance Revolution X2) were removed.

Songs marked in gold are exclusive for golden cabinets.

Song list
Legend:
 🎬 This song has a music video which is played full-screen.
 🎬 (JP) This song has a music video which is played full-screen, but is unavailable outside Japan.
 🎬 (BG) This song has a music video which is played in an in-game background dance stage.
 📜 This song has a background image with lyrics which is full-screen.
 🔒 This song must be unlocked.
 (S) This song has a special dance routine.
 🔷 On European machines, this song requires the August 2018 or April 2021 update.
 🔶 On European machines, this song requires the April 2021 update.
 🚫 Newer arcade Dance Dance Revolution games removed this song in a post-release update.

Dance Dance Revolution (2013) (102 total)

Dance Dance Revolution (2014) (94 total)

Dance Dance Revolution A (157 total)

Dance Dance Revolution A20 (88 total)

Dance Dance Revolution A20 Plus (126 songs)

Dance Dance Revolution A3 (113 total)

See also
Music of Dance Dance Revolution

References

Dance Dance Revolution soundtracks